Outwood Academy Acklam (formerly Oakfields Community College) is a comprehensive secondary school with academy status, located in the Acklam area of Middlesbrough, England. It has a mixed intake of both boy and girls, ages 11–16, with over 1000 pupils on roll .

The school is operated by Outwood Grange Academies Trust, and the current principal is Graham Skidmore.

The school is designated as a National Support School - meaning that it is recognised as a high performing school able to provide support to other schools.

History
The school was first established as Oakfields Community College in September 2011, replacing Hall Garth Community Arts College and King's Manor School in Hall Drive, Acklam. The school then relocated to new building opened in September 2012 as part of Middlesbrough's £100 million Building Schools for the Future scheme.

Oakfields Community College received its first Ofsted inspection report in February 2012, and was placed in special measures after receiving an 'inadequate' rating, the lowest possible. In June 2012 a further Ofsted report again rated the school as inadequate. During this time it was sponsored by the Endeavour Education Trust made up of Macmillan Academy, Middlesbrough College and Teesside University.

The school converted to academy status in September 2013 under the new sponsorship of the Outwood Grange Academies Trust, and was renamed Outwood Academy Acklam. The chief executive is Sir Michael Wilkins, who was recognised in 2010 by the National College for School Leadership with a 'systems leadership award'  and was knighted for services to education in the Queen's New Year Honours 2014.

In 2017, Outwood Academy Acklam was the highest performing school in the North East of England for the progress students made.

Pastoral care
In September 2013 the school restructured the tutor groups, altering the way provision of pastoral care was organised. This involved a move away from the traditional horizontal (same age) structure of forms to a more progressive vertical one. The former structure saw each student belonging to a form group of around 30 pupils from their own year-group, with a teacher acting as a tutor. The new structure maintains a teacher acting each year as a tutor to the group, but the group is mixed-age with students from all years included. They are known as 'Vertical Mentor Groups' ("VMGs"). Each group therefore evolves annually, as older students leave and are replaced by new Year 7 students entering the school.

Each VMG is given the name of a country, and the countries are arranged into five continents. The continents are in different parts of the school: Africa, Asia, The Americas, Europe and Oceania.

Vertical structuring has been implemented in other secondary schools, the main advantages being seen as the mixing of ages leading to an increased sense of community, allowing for pupils to share experiences, foster understanding and reduce bullying. The system also complements the school curriculum, where in many cases, students in Years 9 and 10 and 11 are in the same subject mixed-age option groups.

Behaviour
The school previously used a system of escalating "Consequences" as a framework for School discipline, ranging from C1 to C6 (Expulsion (academia)).

Students are given warnings in lessons for low level disruption. Upon reaching a C4a, the student is removed from the classroom and given an after-school School punishment 30 mins. If the student chooses to not attend the detention, then they receive a C4b, which means it is 1 hour instead of 30 minutes. A C5a is given if the student misbehaves in detention or does attend it. C6 is given when C5 is not completed or misbehaving occurs.

In the wake of the coronavirus, the academy has altered the behaviour policy. Students if misbehaved, will be excluded or removed from lessons. C1 till C4 still remain in place for minor behaviour.

See also 
 Outwood Grange Academies Trust

References

External links
 

Secondary schools in Middlesbrough
Academies in Middlesbrough
Acklam
Educational institutions established in 2011
2011 establishments in England